In number theory, Skewes's number is any of several large numbers used by the South African mathematician Stanley Skewes as upper bounds for the smallest natural number  for which

Skewes's numbers
J.E. Littlewood, who was Skewes's research supervisor, had proved in  that there is such a number (and so, a first such number); and indeed found that the sign of the difference  changes infinitely many times. All numerical evidence then available seemed to suggest that  was always less than  Littlewood's proof did not, however, exhibit a concrete such number .

Skewes's task was to make Littlewood's existence proof effective: exhibiting some concrete upper bound for the first sign change. According to Georg Kreisel, this was at the time not considered obvious even in principle.

More recent estimates
These upper bounds have since been reduced considerably by using large-scale computer calculations of zeros of the Riemann zeta function.
This can be reduced to  assuming the Riemann hypothesis.  gave .

There is no explicit value  known for certain to have the property  though computer calculations suggest some explicit numbers that are quite likely to satisfy this.

Even though the natural density of the positive integers for which  does not exist,  showed that the logarithmic density of these positive integers does exist and is positive.  showed that this proportion is about 0.00000026, which is surprisingly large given how far one has to go to find the first example.

Riemann's formula

where the sum is over all  in the set of non-trivial zeros of the Riemann zeta function.

The other terms above are somewhat smaller, and moreover tend to have different, seemingly random complex arguments, so mostly cancel out. Occasionally however, several of the larger ones might happen to have roughly the same complex argument, in which case they will reinforce each other instead of cancelling and will overwhelm the term .

The reason why the Skewes number is so large is that these smaller terms are quite a lot smaller than the leading error term, mainly because the first complex zero of the zeta function has quite a large imaginary part, so a  large number (several hundred) of them need to have roughly the same argument in order to overwhelm the dominant term.
It also shows why finding places where this happens depends on large scale calculations of millions of high precision zeros of the Riemann zeta function.

The argument above is not a proof, as it assumes the zeros of the Riemann zeta function are random, which is not true. Roughly speaking, Littlewood's proof consists of Dirichlet's approximation theorem to show that sometimes many terms have about the same argument.

The term  is roughly analogous to a second-order correction accounting for squares of primes.

Equivalent for prime k-tuples
An equivalent definition of Skewes' number exists for prime k-tuples. Then the first prime  that violates the Hardy-Littlewood inequality for the (k + 1)-tuple , i.e., the first prime  such that
 
(if such a prime exists) is the Skewes number for 

The table below shows the currently known Skewes numbers for prime k-tuples:

The Skewes number (if it exists) for sexy primes  is still unknown.

It is also unknown whether all admissible k-tuples have a corresponding Skewes number.

References

 
 

 
.

.

External links

 

Large numbers
Number theory
Large integers